Chin Jung-kwon (born April 27, 1963) is a South Korean aesthetician, critic, and professor.

He was born at Gonghang-dong, Yeongdeungpo-gu, Seoul (presently Gonghang-dong, Gangseo-gu). He has three siblings, two older sisters, and one younger brother. His second oldest sister, Unsuk Chin is well known as contemporary classical composer. In 1982 he entered the School of Aesthetics at Seoul National University, and graduated in 1986.

See also
Yoon Seok-youl

References

External links
Personal blog

1963 births
Living people
South Korean translators
South Korean literary critics
South Korean academics
Seoul National University alumni
People from Seoul